Ectemnius arcuatus is a species of square-headed wasp in the family Crabronidae. It is found in North America.

References

Further reading

External links

 

Crabronidae